Susan Davies is an Australian Paralympic archery medalist.

She attended Brisbane Girls Grammar School. In 1970, a car accident left her a paraplegic.  Five years after the accident, she took up archery as part of her physiotherapy. She explained that " it was mainly to help me get balance in a wheelchair. When you sever your spinal cord you have no sensation of where you are sitting or if you are sitting for a start". She practised in her Mount Gravatt back garden and at the Belmont Range in Brisbane. In 1984, she worked part-time as an accountant for the University of Queensland.

She competed at the 1980 Arnhem Games and came 6th in the Women's Double FITA Round Paralplegic.  At the 1984 Stoke Mandeville Games, she won a bronze medal in the Women's Double FITA Round Paraplegic.

References 

Paralympic archers of Australia
Archers at the 1980 Summer Paralympics
Archers at the 1984 Summer Paralympics
Wheelchair category Paralympic competitors
Paralympic bronze medalists for Australia
Living people
Australian female archers
Year of birth missing (living people)
Medalists at the 1984 Summer Paralympics
Paralympic medalists in archery
People with paraplegia